Saint James' Episcopal Church is a historic church in Pewee Valley, Kentucky. It was built in 1869 and added to the National Register of Historic Places in 1985.

Native Pewee Valley limestone was used to construct the building in a Gothic Revival style.  It was completed in 1869 at a cost of $4,000.  William Henry Redin (1822-1904) was the architect.  The design was based on sketches made by Kentucky Bishop Benjamin Bosworth Smith of a 12th-century country church during a trip to England.  In 1908, the congregation began a project to add a rectory.  They sold 14 acres from the original 20-acre site to raise funds for construction of the rectory.

References

Episcopal church buildings in Kentucky
Churches on the National Register of Historic Places in Kentucky
Gothic Revival church buildings in Kentucky
Churches completed in 1869
19th-century Episcopal church buildings
1869 establishments in Kentucky
National Register of Historic Places in Oldham County, Kentucky
Churches in Pewee Valley, Kentucky